Nectandra matogrossensis is a species of plant in the family Lauraceae.

It is endemic to Mato Grosso and Bahia states, in the Atlantic Forest ecoregion of eastern Brazil.

References

matogrossensis
Endemic flora of Brazil
Flora of Bahia
Flora of the Atlantic Forest
Environment of Mato Grosso
Vulnerable flora of South America
Taxonomy articles created by Polbot